The 2002 FIA Sportscar Championship Brno was the third race for the 2002 FIA Sportscar Championship season held at Masaryk Circuit and ran a distance of two hours, thirty minutes.  It took place on 18 May 2002.

Official results

Class winners in bold.  Cars failing to complete 75% of winner's distance marked as Not Classified (NC).

Statistics
 Pole Position - #8 Racing For Holland - 1:51.005
 Fastest Lap - #8 Racing For Holland - 1:51.858

External links
 Race results

B
6 Hours of Brno
FIA Sportscar